Noblella heyeri is a species of frog in the family Strabomantidae. It is found in the Huancabamba Depression in Loja Province, southern Ecuador, and Piura Region, in north-western Peru.
Its natural habitat is upper montane forest, in areas bordering pastures and other open areas, but not old growth forest. It is a terrestrial, nocturnal species living in cracks in the ground below the leaf-litter. It is hard to find, but based on the calls, it is common at least in some locations. It is threatened by habitat loss. It is commonly known as Heyer's leaf frog.

References

heyeri
Amphibians of Ecuador
Amphibians of Peru
Taxonomy articles created by Polbot
Amphibians described in 1986